The Finn Valley Voice is a local newspaper published in the Finn Valley region of central and eastern Donegal, Ireland. The paper was founded in 1994 and is independently owned. It also claims to be the only newspaper in Ireland owned and managed entirely by women. The paper is one of two to be based in the town of Ballybofey, competing with the Finn Valley Post, and covers several other urban areas such as Stranorlar, Lifford, Castlefin and Fintown as well.  The Finn Valley Voice is not accessed by the ABC.

The Finn Valley Voice provides a forum for local news, views, and advertising for local businesses. The Science and Arts sections are  popular, as is the History. Over its lifespan, the paper has amassed what amounts to a social, factual, and community-based history of the Finn and Deele Valleys. The When We Were Young series, the Home From Home series, the First World War series, and hundreds of interviews with people who may since have died now form an irreplaceable archive.

References

External links

1994 establishments in Ireland
Ballybofey
Mass media in County Donegal
Newspapers published in the Republic of Ireland
Publications established in 1994